The vundu (Heterobranchus longifilis) is a species of large airbreathing catfish found widely in rivers and other freshwater habitats of sub-Saharan Africa, as well as the Nile. It is also called the sampa, cur, lenda, or certa.

Description
(Bull sharks are also found in southern Africa and reach a larger size, but occur in both fresh and saltwater.) Few other catfish have such large second dorsal fins (adipose fins) or such long barbels as do the vundu. Its barbels nearly reach to the origin of the pelvic fin. The colour of Heterobranchus longifilis is light to dark olive brown on its dorsal surface, getting lighter over the mid-body to a light brown. Its belly is off-white. Fins are usually light brown.

In aquaculture, it is sometimes hybridized with another very large species, the African sharptooth catfish (Clarias gariepinus), resulting in offspring known as "Hetero-clarias".

Habitat and Range 
The vundu is found widely in rivers and other freshwater habitats of sub-Saharan Africa, only extending beyond this region in the Nile (although it is rare in the lower sections of this river). Among others, it is found in the Benue River, Volta River, Niger River, Gambia River, Senegal River, Lake Chad, Omo River, Congo River Basin, Lake Rukwa, Lake Kariba, Zambezi River, Lake Tanganyika and Lake Edward.

The vundu is generally uncommon, but it is not considered threatened despite having declined locally. Most active at night, it feeds on any available food, including invertebrates and insects when small, then fish and other small vertebrates when large. It scavenges off large carcasses and offal from riverside villages. It can live for 12 or more years. The vundu catfish can survive out of water for extensive periods of time.

The vundu eating habits effects many aspects of their lives; their growth, feeding efficiency, and body mineral composition. If they are raised in captivity and fed a soy based or cotton based meal their growth will reduce significantly. Changing the vundu diets practically is okay, but changing them completely is detrimental to an extent because of the lack of protein they receive in a given meal.

References

Further reading
 Toko, Imorou (1 2); Fiogbe, Emile D., Koukpode, Bruno, Kestemont, Patrick (2007). Rearing of African catfish (Clarias gariepinus) and vundu catfish (Heterobranchus longifilis) in traditional fish ponds (whedos) : Effect of stocking density on growth, production and body composition.   . CODEN AQCLAL. 2007, vol. 262, no. 1, pp. 65–72.
 Vundu in aquaculture

Freshwater fish of Africa
Fish described in 1840
Taxa named by Achille Valenciennes